Rusyn Americans (also known as Carpatho-Rusyn Americans) are citizens of the United States of America, with ancestors who were Rusyns, from Carpathian Ruthenia, or neighboring areas of Central Europe. However, some Rusyn Americans, also or instead identify as Ukrainian Americans, Russian Americans, or even Slovak Americans.

They are sometimes also referred to as Carpatho-Ruthenian Americans, but terms based on Ruthenian designations are often viewed as imprecise, since they have several wider meanings, related to their diverse historical, religious and ethnic uses and scopes, that were encompassing various East Slavic groups.

Since the Revolutions of 1989, there has been a revival in Rusyn nationalism and self-identification in both Carpathian Ruthenia and among the Rusyn diaspora in other parts of Europe and North America.

History
Rusyns began immigrating to the United States in the late 1870s and in the 1880s. Upon arrival in North America, the vast majority of Rusyns identified with the larger state that they had left. It is, therefore, impossible to know their exact number. It is estimated that between the 1880s and 1914 some 225,000 Carpatho-Rusyn immigrants came to northeastern United States. Based on immigration statistics and membership records in religious and secular organizations, it is reasonable to assume that there are about 620,000 Americans who have at least one ancestor of Rusyn background.

At the time of the first and largest wave of immigration (1880s to 1914), the Rusyn homeland was located entirely within the Austro-Hungarian Empire. In both parts of Austria-Hungary, the economic situation for Rusyns was the same. Their approximately 1,000 villages were all located in hilly or mountainous terrain from which the inhabitants eked out a subsistence-level existence based on small-scale agriculture, livestock grazing (especially sheep), and seasonal labor on the richer plains of lowland Hungary.

Since earning money was the main goal of the immigrants, they settled primarily in the northeast and north central states, in particular the coal mining region around Scranton and Wilkes-Barre in northeastern Pennsylvania, and in the Pittsburgh and Erie areas of the western part of that state. Other cities and metropolitan areas that attracted Rusyns were Philadelphia, Pennsylvania; New York City and northeastern New Jersey; southern Connecticut; the Binghamton-Endicott-Johnson City triangle in south central New York; Cleveland and Youngstown, Ohio; Chicago, Illinois; Gary and Whiting, Indiana; Detroit and Flint, Michigan; and Minneapolis, Minnesota. By 1920, nearly 80 percent of all Rusyns lived in only three states: Pennsylvania (54 percent), New York (13 percent), and New Jersey (12 percent).

Like other eastern and southern Europeans, Rusyns were effectively segregated from the rest of American society because of their low economic status and lack of knowledge of English. This was, however, a relatively short-term phase, since the American-born sons and daughters of the original immigrants had, by the late 1930s and 1940s, assimilated and become absorbed into the American mainstream.

Cultural Center 

The Carpatho-Rusyn Society has purchased the historic former Cathedral of St. John the Baptist in Munhall, Pennsylvania to convert it into the nation's first National Carpatho-Rusyn Cultural Center.

The historic structure was the first cathedral in America exclusively for Carpatho-Rusyns. It was built in 1903 at the corner of Tenth and Dickson Streets in Munhall, just outside of Pittsburgh. Designed by the Hungarian-born architect, Titus de Bobula, and patterned after the Rusyn Greek Catholic Cathedral of the Exaltation of the Holy Cross in Uzhorod, Subcarpathian Rus. The parish was established in 1897 and the church, the parish's second, was built in 1903. By the 1920s the congregation had more than 700 families. In 1929 it was chosen as the cathedral for the Ruthenian Greek Catholic Exarchate in America.

The congregation, then known as St. John the Baptist Byzantine Catholic parish, left the building in 1993 when it constructed a new suburban cathedral. In April 2004, the property was purchased by the Carpatho-Rusyn Society to create a home and center for the organization and culture.

Notable people

References

Sources

 
 
 
 
  
 
 
 
 
 

European-American society
 
 

cs:Kategorie:Rusíni v USA
rue:Катеґорія:Русиньскы Америчаны
sk:Kategória:Rusíni v USA